Carreira may refer to:

Carreira (surname)
Carreira (Ribeira), a parish in the municipality of Ribeira, Galicia, Spain
Carreira (Barcelos), a parish in the municipality of Barcelos, Portugal
Carreira (Santo Tirso), a parish in the municipality of Santo Tirso, Portugal

See also
Carreiras (Portalegre), a parish in Portalegre Municipality, Portugal